"Just Ask Me To" is a song by American R&B Singer Tevin Campbell. It was released in June 1991 as the second single from his debut album T.E.V.I.N. It did well on the R&B chart, reaching number nine, but not as much success on the pop chart, where it peaked at number 88. The song featured rapper Chubb Rock and was also featured on the Boyz n the Hood soundtrack.

Track listing
US Cassette Single
 Just Ask Me To (Album Version) 4:08
 Just Ask Me To (Hip Hop Mix) 4:06

Charts

References

1991 singles
Tevin Campbell songs
1991 songs
Songs written by Al B. Sure!
Warner Records singles
Songs written by Kyle West